The Interstate 8 Athletic Conference is an athletic conference for high schools in Michigan formed in 2014 with eight schools from in south central Michigan. The conference currently consists of Class A, B, and C schools from Barry, Branch, Calhoun, and Jackson counties. The name of the conference derives from the I-69 and I-94 corridors.

History
The conference was founded in 2014 with the following charter members: Charlotte, Coldwater, Harper Creek, Jackson Lumen Christi, Jackson Northwest, Marshall, Parma Western, and Pennfield.

After the 2015-16 school year, Charlotte left the conference and eventually rejoin the Capital Area Activities Conference. Hastings from the Ottawa-Kent Conference was selected to replace Charlotte starting in the 2016-17 school year.

In August 2022, it was announced that Lumen Christi, the smallest member and the only private school in the conference would depart the Interstate 8 to join the Catholic High School League beginning in the 2023-24 school year. With Lumen Christi departing, this means that the remaining seven schools at one point or another participated in the old Twin Valley Conference that existed from 1931 to 2001.

Member schools

Current members

Notes

Former members

Membership Timeline

Football
This list goes through the 2016 season.

References

Michigan high school sports conferences
High school sports conferences and leagues in the United States
2014 establishments in Michigan